The 1961 Missouri Tigers football team was an American football team that represented the University of Missouri in the Big Eight Conference (Big 8) during the 1961 NCAA University Division football season. The team compiled a 7–2–1 record (5–2 against Big 8 opponents), finished in a tie for second place in the Big 8, and outscored opponents by a combined total of 124 to 57. Dan Devine was the head coach for the fourth of 13 seasons. The team played its home games at Memorial Stadium in Columbia, Missouri.

The team's statistical leaders included Andy Russell with 412 rushing yards, Ron Taylor with 428 passing yards and 514 yards of total offense, Conrad Hitchler with 124 receiving yards, and Bill Tobin with 38 point scored.

Schedule

References

Missouri
Missouri Tigers football seasons
Missouri Tigers football